Greg Fidelman (born September 4, 1965) is an American record mixer, engineer and record producer. He is a frequent collaborator of producer Rick Rubin, and has worked with many bands in various genres, including Metallica, Slayer, High on Fire, Black Sabbath, Red Hot Chili Peppers, Bush, Audioslave, Marilyn Manson, Slipknot, and System of a Down, but has also worked on albums by U2, Johnny Cash, Neil Diamond and others.

Before going into music engineering, he was the former lead guitarist in the band Rhino Bucket, being credited by the name Greg Fields.

Notable albums worked on

References
Cited

General

1965 births
20th-century American guitarists
American audio engineers
American record producers
American rock guitarists
Living people
Grammy Award winners